Mike Compton (born February 29, 1956 in Meridian, Mississippi) is an American  bluegrass mandolin player and former protégé of the Father of Bluegrass, Bill Monroe. He is considered a modern master of bluegrass mandolin.

Biography
Befriended and mentored by Bill Monroe, the acknowledged Father of Bluegrass Music, Mike Compton is one of today's foremost interpreters of Monroe's genre-creating mandolin style.  Mandolin students from around the world make the pilgrimage to his annual Monroe Mandolin Camp in Nashville, Tennessee, where Compton and a select handful of other experts teach everything from the basics of bluegrass mandolin (fiddle and banjo) to the most intimate details of Monroe's endlessly inspiring mandolin style.

Mike Compton's decades of touring and recording — with musical luminaries ranging from rockstars Sting, Gregg Allman, and Elvis Costello, to straight-from-the-still acoustic legends such as John Hartford, Doc Watson, Peter Rowan, Ralph Stanley, and David Grisman — have established Compton as a true master of the modern American mandolin and a premier interpreter of roots and Americana musical styles.

Compton's mastery of mandolin is at once effortless and exceptional.  A compelling entertainer either alone or with a group, his skills as a singer, arranger, instrumentalist, composer, and accompanist also make him in-demand as a band member and ensemble player at festivals, clubs and concert halls, recording sessions, music workshops, and as a private instructor.  With more than 120 recordings in his discography, including work with Willie Nelson, Dolly Parton, and Patty Loveless, Compton has helped keep mandolin a cool, relevant sound as the modern musical styles ebb and evolve to reach an ever-broadening audience.

A native of Mississippi, Compton picked up the mandolin in his teens and absorbed the area's native blues, old-time country, and bluegrass sounds.  Compton learned music from an early age as his great-grandfather was an old-time fiddler. Initially, Compton began playing the trombone but switched to guitar instead and later to mandolin playing old-time music with his cousin. He became interested in bluegrass music and eventually learned to play like Bill Monroe. At the Bean Blossom Bluegrass Festival in 1975, he finally met Monroe.

After Compton had finished his education at the Meridian Junior College he gravitated  to Nashville and joined Hubert Davis and the Season Travelers in 1977. Four years later, in 1981, he left Davis' band. He spent the early 1980s working as a cook, a printer, and as a part-time musician.  In the mid-1980s, Compton helped found one of the 20th Century's most admired and influential bluegrass groups, the iconic Nashville Bluegrass Band.  After a bus accident, which left Mark Hembree injured, Compton reassessed his life, eventually temporarily quitting the business and moved to the Catskills, working as a cottage caretaker.  Compton continued to dabble with music recording albums with various artists, and in 1995, he recorded with Bill Monroe's Bluegrass Boys.  Compton couldn't stay away from his craft and In the mid-1990s, he joined John Hartford in touring, and recording several albums together with him. In 2000, Compton returned once again to the Nashville Bluegrass Band and continues to tour and play with this group, now 30+ years in the business.  Compton also tours internationally with the brother duet partnership duo of Compton & Newberry, with the super-group Helen Highwater Stringband, and as a soloist.

When A-list Americana producer T Bone Burnett needed experts in authentic rural musical styles to anchor the landmark O Brother, Where Art Thou? movie project and subsequent tour, he called upon Compton's unique knowledge and signature mandolin style to authenticate the Soggy Bottom Boys' roots sound.  That Grammy-Award Album of the Year winning album went on to sell seven million copies, and sparked a global revival in old-time and bluegrass musical styles.

Connoisseur of hand-painted vintage silk ties, popularizer of the denim overall urban fashion statement, lover of iconic men's hats and curator of oddball official days, Mike Compton thrives at the intersection of traditional funk and modern authenticity.

Equally skilled in bluegrass, old-time string band music, country blues, roots Americana styles, and much more, Compton soars beyond easy categorization as an acoustic mandolin player and singer.  Gifted at tastefully incorporating rural, roots-based lead and rhythm mandolin styles into modern Americana music, Compton's unique musical skill set allows him to entertain audiences ranging from rockers and urban hipsters to die-hard country, folk, and bluegrass fans.

Awards
In 2001 and 2002, Compton was nominated as IBMA Mandolinist of the Year. In 2002, O Brother, Where Art Thou?, an album containing one of his songs, was awarded the Grammy Award for best album. In recognition of his achievements, he received a commendation from the Mississippi State Senate.

Discography

See also
Bluegrass music
Country music
Mandolin
Grammy Awards
International Bluegrass Music Association
Americana Music Association
Grand Ole Opry

Notes

References
 Carlin, Richard (2003), Country Music: A Biographical Dictionary, Taylor & Francis
 Rosenberg, Neil V. - Wolfe, Charles K. (2007), The Music of Bill Monroe, University of Illinois Press

External links
 Official site
 Mandolin Magazine Article
 Mike Compton biography at nashvillebluegrassband.net
 
 

1956 births
Living people
Musicians from Meridian, Mississippi
American folk musicians
Grammy Award winners
American music educators
American bluegrass mandolinists
Country musicians from Mississippi
Nashville Bluegrass Band members